The 2000 Scott Tournament of Hearts Canadian women's national curling championship, was played at the CN Centre in Prince George, British Columbia February 19–27. Kelley Law and her British Columbia team won the final defeating Anne Merklinger of Ontario. Law had to win four straight games after the round robin to win the championship.

Teams

Standings

Results

Draw 1

Draw 2

Draw 3

Draw 4

Draw 5

Draw 6

Draw 7

Draw 8

Draw 9

Draw 10

Draw 11

Draw 12

Draw 13

Draw 14

Draw 15

Draw 16

Draw 17

Tiebreaker

Page playoffs

1 vs. 2

3 vs. 4

Semi-final

Final

References

Scotties Tournament of Hearts
Scott Tournament of Hearts
Scott Tournament Of Hearts, 2000
Sport in Prince George, British Columbia
Curling in British Columbia
2000 in women's curling